Isa Tapia is a New York–based shoe and accessories designer from San Juan, Puerto Rico, who launched her eponymous footwear line in 2012. She came to prominence at  Oscar de la Renta as his apprentice during her senior year at Parsons School of Design.

In 2014, Tapia was part of the CFDA incubator program for new designer brands and won the Target design challenge . She was inducted into the Council of Fashion Designers of America in 2016.

References

Fashionista. "How Isa Tapia Launched Her Own Footwear Brand After A Decade In Fashion"
W Magazine. "Isa Tapia Designs Shoes Made For Dancing"
Olivia Palermo. "Designers To Watch: Isa Tapia".
The New Potato. "Who's Who Entrepreneurs"

External links
 

American fashion designers
American women fashion designers
Living people
Year of birth missing (living people)
Shoe designers
21st-century American women